Avrainvillea is a genus of green algae in the family Dichotomosiphonaceae.

As sources of  bioactive natural products
The organic extract of Avrainvillea longicaulis had antioxidant activity surpassing or equivalent to that of commercially available antioxidants (butylated hydroxytoluene, butylated hydroxyanisole and alpha-tocopherol).

Avrainvillea erecta was reported to have strong hemagglutination activity. In addition, the chloroform fraction of a methanol extract of Avrainvillea erecta exhibited hydrogen peroxide scavenging activity as strong as that shown by gallic acid.

References

Bryopsidales
Ulvophyceae genera